The men's doubles of the 2006 ECM Prague Open tournament was played on clay in Prague, Czech Republic.

Jordan Kerr and Sebastián Prieto were the defending champions, but Prieto did not compete this year. Kerr teamed up with Ashley Fisher and lost in semifinals to Ramón Delgado and Sergio Roitman.

Petr Pála and David Škoch won the title by defeating Ramón Delgado and Sergio Roitman 6–0, 6–0 in the final.

Seeds

Draw

Draw

External Links
 Main Draw
 Qualifying Draw

2006 Men's Doubles